Park Hee-seong (born April 7, 1990) is a South Korean football player who plays for Jeonnam Dragons.

He joined FC Seoul in 2013.

References

External links 

 

1990 births
Living people
Association football forwards
South Korean footballers
FC Seoul players
Gimcheon Sangmu FC players
Gimhae FC players
K League 1 players
Korea University alumni
Footballers at the 2010 Asian Games
Asian Games bronze medalists for South Korea
Sportspeople from South Jeolla Province
Asian Games medalists in football
Medalists at the 2010 Asian Games